Nils Borring Sørensen (born 24 February 1959) is a Danish politician. He is a member of the Danish Social Democrats, and was mayor in Favrskov Municipality from 2010 to 2021.

He is educated as a Public school teacher and has worked as a public school librarian.

He was elected in the Hammel Byråd in 1996, and has been a member of Favrskov Municipality council since 2006.

References 

1959 births
Living people
Mayors of places in Denmark